Cen Deguang (1897–?) was a politician of the collaborationist Wang Jingwei regime. He, along with Wang Jingwei, was considered by many Chinese to be a Hanjian, or traitor. Deguang claimed he was just following orders, since his friend Wang was his superior. He is from Guangxi, son of Cen Chunxuan.

References

1897 births
Year of death unknown
People from Baise
Republic of China politicians from Guangxi
Chinese collaborators with Imperial Japan
Kuomintang collaborators with Imperial Japan